The Wilmington Blue Bombers were an American basketball team based in Wilmington, Delaware. They were a member of the American Basketball League.

The Blue Bombers are largely remembered for a scandal involving importing points from other games into their own in an attempt to spice up their placid, boring playstyle.  Sports journalists began to grow suspicious after a high school game Bombers coach Neil Johnston attended concluded with a score of 12-8 despite being a thrilling back-and-forth game that went to overtime played with a lot of hustle, while a Bombers game where the entire second half was spent by the team in the lead passing the ball back and forth back court (as shot clocks were not employed) somehow ended with a thrilling 86-85 score.  The Bombers were forced to give the points back, and the scores were restored to their original values.

Year-by-year

See also
 Delaware Stars
 Wilmington Jets
 List of professional sports teams in Delaware

Basketball teams in Delaware
Sports in Wilmington, Delaware